Antonius Diogenes was the author of an ancient Greek romance entitled The Wonders Beyond Thule (Τὰ ὑπὲρ Θoύλην ἄπιστα Apista huper Thoulen). Scholars have placed him in the 2nd century CE, but his age was unknown even to Photios, who wrote a synopsis of the romance. The romance was a novel of twenty-four books and was written in the form of a dialogue about travels. It is highly praised by Photios for its vivid narration, its clearness, and the gracefulness of its descriptions.

Scholars have tended to take it as a given that Lucian of Samosata had Diogenes' work principally in mind when he wrote his celebrated parody, the  Verae Historiae (True Histories), but J.R. Morgan has more recently questioned this accepted notion upon extensive comparative study of the two works.

Summary of the novel in Photios 

The current knowledge of the novel's content is from Photios, who left a brief summary in his lengthy volume of what-is-worth-to-read, Myriobiblos, which he made for his idle brother, Tarasios, to allow him to choose which books to read. Two sections in Porphyry also partially survive, where the novel is used as a historical source for his Life of Pythagoras, but neither section is very helpful about the plot. The few surviving papyrus fragments of the novel, however, do reveal some aspects of the structure and content.

Even though Photios praises the work in high tones, both for its style clarity and its plot credibility, the summary of the content that he presents creates a confusing impression, mainly because of the multiple nested levels of narration.

The novel begins in an outermost layer where the author introduces a Roman, Faustinus, who travels the world in search of rare books to give to his bibliophile sister Isidora. His latest journey has taken him to Tyros. A corresponding letter of the author follows a dedication to his own sister, also named Isidora.

Faustinus discovers a letter whose contents form the novel's first frame. It was written by a Greek, Balagros, a member of the Somatophylax Guard of Alexander the Great, to his wife Phila, the eldest daughter of Antipater; the couple are genuine historical figures incorporated into the novel. Balagros reports that after the conquest of Tyros, Alexander, Hephaistion and Parmenion were shown a hypogeium containing several stone sarcophagi. These were adorned with peculiar inscriptions:

 "Lysilla lived 35 years"
 "Mnason, son of Mantinias lived 66 years, then 71 years"
 "Aristion, son of Philocles lived 47 years, then 52 years"
 "Mantinias, son of Mnason lived, 42 years, then 706 nights"
 "Derkyllis, daughter of Mnason lived, 39 years, then 760 nights"
 "Deinias the Arcas, lived 125 years"

Thus, the readers are introduced to the novel's significant characters. Also in the hypogeum was a box of cypress wood, bearing the inscription: "Oh, stranger, who opens this, learn from the miracles." Inside, Alexander and his companions found documents composed by Deinias and Derkyllis, which form the main narrative of the novel.

In this narrative, two Greek natives of Arcadia, Deinias and his son Demochares, are off on a journey to the outermost edges of the Oikoumene. Beyond the Pontos they reach the springs of the river Tanais and the Rhipaean Mountains, and, beyond these, the outer ocean. After a long journey across Oceanus—in the course of which three traveling companions called Karmanes, Meniskos, and Azulis join them—they at last reach the legendary island of Thule (perhaps Iceland, the Faroe Islands, Shetland, or Norway).

There they find a certain Phoenician noblewoman named Derkyllis, a native of Tyros. Derkyllis and Deinias fall in love with each other, and she reveals to him the adventurous but sad and rather convoluted fate of her and her brother Mantinias. Years later, an elderly Deinias confides the stories of Derkyllis and Mantinias, as well as his own experiences, to Kymbas, an envoy of the Arcadian League, sent to Tyros to summon Deinias back home.

In the narrative of Derkyllis, she and her brother Mantinias, children of Mnasion, are driven from their home by the schemes of the novel's villain, an Egyptian priest named Paapis. Feigning gratitude to Mnasion's family, who have been his benefactors, Paapis works to steal their wealth. He tricks the children into giving their parents a supposedly benevolent magic formula, which puts them into a deathlike sleep. Believing that they have murdered their parents, Derkyllis and Mantinias flee in grief, first arriving at Rhodes and Crete, then continuing onto the lands of the Tyrrhenians and the Cimmerians. There, deep in the land of barbarians and at the edge of the known world, Derkyllis finds the entrance to Hades and meets a deceased servant named Myrto, who teaches her secrets of the Underworld.

Returning from Hades, Derkyllis and her companions, Keryllos and Astraios, come by the "grave of the Siren." The story here gets more entangled because it inserts portions of the life of Pythagoras—the ones quoted by Porphyry in his biography of Pythagoras.

Astraios explains how, during a journey, Mnesarchus, a stepfather of Pythagoras, noticed the exceptional abilities of the child as he watched him lying under a white poplar, looking at the sun without blinking. The poplar was dripping nourishing dew from a small tube. Endeared with this prodigy child, Mnesarchus took him along for the journey. On the isle of Samos he entrusted the child to the care of a native citizen named Androcles. Finally Androcles adopted the boy, whom he named Astraios, and raised him along with his biological sons Eunostos, Tyrrhenos, and Pythagoras. Astraios now reports how Androcles had taken up the education of Pythagoras, training him in the lyre, in wrestling, and in painting. Then the philosopher Anaximander of Miletus taught the boy of the deepest wisdom of the Egyptians, the Arabs, the Chaldeans, and the Hebrews. Astraios himself had been handed over to Pythagoras, who after a physiognomic test accepted him as a student. Thus ends the report of Astraios—which is Porphyry's citation of Antonius Diogenes about the life of Pythagoras, in which is also reflected what Astraios had heard by a woman named Philotis regarding Pythagoras and his teachings.

This detour in the story completed, the existing members of the Derkyllis, Keryllos, and Astraios group arrive in Iberia, first into a city whose inhabitants are blind during daytime, although they can see at night. With the help of a flute, Astraios harms their enemies, the bloodthirsty and stupid Celts, from whom the team flees by changing their horses' colors, escaping to Akytania. Astraios is particularly appreciated because the waning and waxing of his eyes is thought to correspond to the waning and waxing of the moon. The changes of the moon regulate the change of rule between the local kings. Derkyllis is impressed by the people of Artabrians, whose women go to war while the men stay home and look after the household chores. Somehow the Asturians overtake Keryllos and condemn him to death as a punishment for an old debt, and so he dies.

The Derkyllis team then returns to Italy and Sicily. But it gets captured at Mount Eryx and is driven before Ainesidemos, the tyrant of Leontinoi. In the court of the tyrant they are to their dismay confronted by Paapis, the Egyptian villain. But Derkyllis, to her delight, also meets her lost brother, Mantinias, who has experienced an even more peculiar journey, travelling to the edge of the world and beyond. Now he tells his sister of this journey up into the realms of the Sun and Moon. (This is the very report that seems to have been parodied by Lucian in his True History.)

The reunited siblings flee Paapis, carrying off some of his magic books as well as a box with magical plants. They escape to Rhegion and then to Metapontum, a center of Pythagorean studies, where they meet with Astraios once more. Continuing with him, they travel all the way to the lands of the Getae and the Thracians, where they come across the Thracian (and probably also Pythagorean) sage, Zalmoxis. Zalmoxis predicts that the siblings will finally get to Thule, where the unintentionally-committed crime against their parents will be atoned for by them willingly suffering a similar fate. So the siblings are off to Thule, still hunted by the evil Paapis, who confronts them again. Engaging some magical spell, he spits at their faces. This induces in them a deathlike sleep from which they can only arise after every sunset. Thruscanes, a resident of Thule and witness to the alleged murder by Derkyllis and her brother, kills Paapis along with himself. Yet, because the siblings are believed to be dead, they are given a memorial and buried. At night they awake. Thus it turns out that the spell of Paapis only lasts during daytime, with the siblings alive and well during the night.

Subsequently, the siblings' companion, Azulis, and the Arcadian travellers, Deinias and Demochares, begin to study Paapis' books of magic. They search for the means to relieve Derkyllis and Mantinias from the vampire-like curse that haunts them, hoping as well to help the parents of the two, who, back in Tyros, apparently suffer from a similar condition of living death. Finally the entire team, including the siblings, head back to Tyros. But Deinias, travelling with Karmanes and Meniskos, again finds himself straying from the destination, ending up further north. So these fellows enter the territory of eternal night and finally reach to the Moon, where the three travellers meet with the Sibyl. She grants them the fulfillment of one request each. Deinias simply wishes to return to his beloved Derkyllis in Tyros, which is granted. Falling asleep—like Ulysses does in Skheria—Deinias wakes up in Tyros, where eventually all are happily reunited.

It can be surmised that, at this point, the novel works its way back through one or more of the nested frames and ends.

Interpretation 

It is a 24-book comprehensive volume, only synoptically reproduced by Photius. So, it only seems probable that the contents of the Photiοs summary, do not conform to the novel's actual extent. It has been assumed that a substantial part of the summary contents are meant from starters to be read as paradox material. The assumption is also supported by Photiοs himself explicitly admitting to noticing digressions and bays.

As far as interpretation and classification of the work, the research is primarily concerned with two interrelated questions. Firstly, concerning the nature of the novel. It is obvious that the teachings of the Pythagoreans play a certain role in the novel - but how was it supposed to be read, in the first place? Is it lightly read, as a mystery novel, as a love story, or even as a trivial travelogue?

The idea of it being read as a mystery novel was early represented by Karl Bürger, and lately by Reinhold Merkelbach. Rohde points out several references to the Pythagorean religion, choosing not to interpret the novel exclusively as a mystery book. From this perspective arises yet another question: If the relationship between the True Histories of Lucian and the Wonders beyond Thule is undisputed, what is the nature of the True Histories parody? Is the ridicule directed against the dizzy genre of pseudohistorical travel narration or is it against the novel's particular religious overtone? And if so, is Lucian criticizing the wider asterism of Pythagorean ideas, or is he in opposition to a particular sect?

Klaus Reyhl went to extremes in his dissertation examining the dependency of the True Histories on the Apista, claiming that it is possible to reconstruct the Apista, at least in parts. This view was not widely accepted. Morgan has rejected Reyhl's thesis flatly in his own study of the matter.

Of course the problem basically lies with the lack of any original text. Surviving traditional texts (e.g. the Aethiopica of Heliodorus of Emesa), as compared to their corresponding summaries of Photios in Myriobiblos, add a word of caution. To base far-reaching deductions on the scope of the existing plot summary is rather risky. No solid conclusions are possible from the scanty, confused, and sometimes difficult-to-grasp summary given by Photios, originally only meant as an incentive for his idle brother, Tarasios, to read the novel.

See also

 Pythagoreanism

Notes

References

Smith, William (editor); Dictionary of Greek and Roman Biography and Mythology, "Diogenes (1)", Boston, (1867)

Ancient Greek novelists
2nd-century Romans
2nd-century novelists
Diogenes